is a railway station in the town of Yamatsuri, Fukushima, Japan, operated by East Japan Railway Company (JR East).

Lines

Station layout
The station has one side platform serving a single bi-directional track. The station is unattended.

History
Yamatsuriyama Station opened on March 27, 1937 as a temporary stop, and elevated to a full passenger station on November 15, 1939. The station was absorbed into the JR East network upon the privatization of the Japanese National Railways (JNR) on April 1, 1987.

Surrounding area

Yamatsuri Jinja
Yamatsuriyama

See also
 List of Railway Stations in Japan

External links

  

Stations of East Japan Railway Company
Railway stations in Fukushima Prefecture
Suigun Line
Railway stations in Japan opened in 1939
Yamatsuri, Fukushima